Alexis Sigismund Weissenberg (26 July 1929 – 8 January 2012) was a Bulgarian-born French pianist.

Early life and career
Born into a Jewish family in Sofia, Weissenberg began taking piano lessons at the age of three from Pancho Vladigerov, a Bulgarian composer. He gave his first public performance at the age of eight.

In 1941, he and his mother tried to escape from German-occupied Bulgaria for Turkey, but were caught and imprisoned in a makeshift concentration camp in Bulgaria for three months. A German guard – who had enjoyed hearing Alexis play Schubert on the accordion – hurriedly took him and his mother to the train station, throwing the accordion to him through the window and told them, "Good luck". They safely arrived in Istanbul a day later.

In 1945, they emigrated to Palestine, where Weissenberg studied under Leo Kestenberg and performed Beethoven with the Israel Philharmonic under the direction of Leonard Bernstein. In 1946, Weissenberg went to the Juilliard School to study with Olga Samaroff. He also studied with Artur Schnabel and Wanda Landowska.

In 1947, Weissenberg made his New York City debut with the New York Philharmonic Orchestra and George Szell in Rachmaninoff's Piano Concerto No. 3 and with Philadelphia Orchestra and Eugene Ormandy, with which Weissenberg won the Leventritt Competition. Between 1957 and 1965, he took an extended sabbatical for the purpose of studying and teaching.  Weissenberg resumed his career in 1966 with a recital in Paris. Later that year he played Tchaikovsky's Piano Concerto No. 1 in Berlin conducted by Herbert von Karajan, who praised him as "one of the best pianists of our time".

Weissenberg gave piano master classes all over the world.  He had many notable students at his Piano Master Class in Engelberg (Switzerland), including Kirill Gerstein, Simon Mulligan, Ivan Moravec, Mehmet Okonsar , Nazzareno Carusi, Andrey Ponochevny, Loris Karpell, and Roberto Carnevale among them. He composed piano music and a musical, Nostalgie, which was premiered at the State Theatre of Darmstadt on 17 October 1992.

Weissenberg died on 8 January 2012 at the age of 82 in Lugano, Switzerland after suffering from Parkinson's disease. He was survived by three children, David, Cristina and Maria.

Recorded works
He recorded extensively, including works of Schumann, Rachmaninoff, Liszt and Chopin.

Among his other notable interpretations were those of Johannes Brahms's Piano Concerto No. 1, with Carlo Maria Giulini and Riccardo Muti, ("Les Introuvables d'Alexis Weissenberg", 2004), Rachmaninoff's Piano Concerto No. 2 with Herbert von Karajan and the Berlin Philharmonic, as well as his Piano Concerto No. 3 with Georges Prêtre and the Chicago Symphony Orchestra, and Seiji Ozawa with the Boston Symphony Orchestra (also with Leonard Bernstein and the Orchestre National de France).

His 1965 film recording of Stravinsky's Three Movements from Petrushka (directed by Åke Falck) was also highly praised. When Karajan watched the movie, he immediately invited Weissenberg to participate in a filmed performance of the Tchaikovsky First Concerto, replacing Sviatoslav Richter.

Selected discography

Audio
 Bach: Goldberg Variations
 Bach: Jesu bleibet meine Freude (Choral – aus: Herz und Mund und Tat und Leben BWV 147), Orfeo (CD)
 Bartók: Piano Concerto No. 2 with Eugene Ormandy and the Philadelphia Orchestra RCA 
 Beethoven: The Five Piano Concertos with Herbert von Karajan and the Berlin Philharmonic Orchestra  EMI (3 CDs)
 Beethoven: Piano Sonatas: "Pathétique, Moonlight and Appassionata"
 Brahms: Piano Concerto No. 1 (two recordings, with Carlo Maria Giulini and Riccardo Muti, EMI
 Brahms: Rhapsodie g-Moll op. 79 Nr. 2, Orfeo (CD)
 Brahms: Étude F-Dur, Orfeo (CD) 
 Brahms: Sonatas for violin & piano Nos. 1–3, with Anne-Sophie Mutter. EMI (CD)
 Chopin: Piano Sonata No. 3, Ballade No. 4, Nocturnes. SWR Music (CD)
 Chopin: Works for piano and orchestra. EMI (2 CDs)
 Chopin: The Nocturnes. EMI
 Chopin: Piano Sonata Nos. 2 and 3 EMI
 Debussy: Estampes, Suite Bergamasque, Children's Corner, L'Isle Joyeuse, etc. on Deutsche Grammophon
 Debussy:  Piano works. Deutsche Grammophon (CD)
 Franck: Symphonic Variations for piano and orchestra (with Herbert von Karajan and The Berlin Philharmonic)
 Haydn:  Sonatas Hob.XVI/20,37 & 52, RCA (LP)
 Liszt: Piano sonata in B minor.  Einsatz Records, Japan
 Liszt: Valse impromptu A-Dur, Orfeo (CD)
 Mozart: Piano Concertos Nos. 9 and 21 with Giulini and the Vienna Symphony Orchestra
 Mussorgsky: Pictures at an Exhibition, Orfeo (CD)
 Mussorgsky: Pictures at an Exhibition, EMI
 Prokofiev: Piano concerto No.3 – Seiji Ozawa, Orchestre de Paris
 Rachmaninoff: Complete Preludes. RCA (CD)
 Rachmaninoff: Piano Sonatas Nos. 1, 2. Deutsche Grammophon (CD)
 Rachmaninoff: Piano Concerto No. 2 (with Herbert von Karajan and the Berlin Philharmonic Orchestra, 1972)
 Rachmaninoff: Piano Concerto No. 3 (three different recordings, with Georges Pretre, Seiji Ozawa and Leonard Bernstein)
 Ravel: Piano concerto – Seiji Ozawa, Orchestre de Paris
 Ravel: Le Tombeau de Couperin, Orfeo (CD)
 Scarlatti: Sonatas (A selection of 15) on Deutsche Grammophon
 Schumann: Fantasie, op. 17. Orfeo (CD)
 Schumann: "Carnaval" op.9, "Kinderszenen", Op. 15 (Toshiba-EMI)

Video
 Alexis Weissenberg DVD: Classic Archive 2008 – Bach, Brahms, Chopin, Prokofiev, Stravinsky.

Books
 Gustl Breuer/Henno Lohmeyer (Hrsg.): »Alexis Weissenberg. Ein kaleidoskopisches Porträt«. Rembrandt Verlag, Berlin 1977.
 Lettre d'Alexis Weissenberg à Bernard Gavoty, 1966
 Weissenberg – Drei Interviews – 2012, Sofia

References

External links
 Official Archive for Alexis Weissenberg
 Official website for Alexis Weissenberg (To be superseded by the archive at http://alexisweissenbergarchive.com/)
 Arkiv Music page on Alexis Weissenberg
 Bach Cantatas website biography of Alexis Weissenberg
 David Dubal interview with Alexis Weissenberg (1 of 3), WNCN-FM, 10 April 1981
 David Dubal interview with Alexis Weissenberg (2 of 3), WNCN-FM, 17 April 1981
 David Dubal interview with Alexis Weissenberg (3 of 3), WNCN-FM, 24 April 1981
 
 
 

Jewish classical pianists
Bulgarian classical pianists
20th-century French male classical pianists
Leventritt Award winners
Juilliard School alumni
Jews who emigrated to escape Nazism
Bulgarian refugees
Bulgarian emigrants to Israel
Bulgarian expatriates in France
Bulgarian people of Jewish descent
Deutsche Grammophon artists
Erato Records artists
Musicians from Sofia
1929 births
2012 deaths
Piano pedagogues
French music educators
Commandeurs of the Ordre des Arts et des Lettres